Lago di Guardialfiera is a lake in the Province of Campobasso, Molise, Italy. The lake is a reservoir that was initially built by man in the 1970s for agricultural and industrial purposes. The area around the lake is surrounded by hills.

Wildlife 
The wildlife inside of the lake includes: 

 Carp
 Chub
 Northern Pike
 Largemouth bass
 Eels
 Catfish
 Trout

References

Lakes of Molise